Daniel Vaca (born 3 November 1978 in Santa Cruz de la Sierra) is a Bolivian football goalkeeper who currently plays for Royal Pari.

References

External links
 
 
 

1978 births
Living people
Sportspeople from Santa Cruz de la Sierra
Bolivian footballers
Bolivia international footballers
The Strongest players
Club San José players
Club Blooming players
C.D. Jorge Wilstermann players
2011 Copa América players
Association football goalkeepers